The Liberty Football Conference was an NCAA Division III football-only conference that existed from 1985 to 1992. The league a total of nine members, all located in the state of New York.

Members

Champions

1985 – Merchant Marine
1986 – Merchant Marine
1987 – Fordham
1988 – Fordham and C.W. Post
1989 – St. John's (NY)
1990 – C.W. Post
1991 – St. John's (NY)
1992 – Wagner

Standings

See also
 List of defunct college football conferences

References